Consolidated Rail Leasing is an Australian locomotive and rolling stock leasing company. It was formed in 2012 as a subsidiary of Southern Shorthaul Railroad. It was formerly known as BRM Leasing.

In February 2013, the operational fleet consisted of 4911, BRM001 and BRM002 which were manufactured at Southern Shorthaul Railroad's North Bendigo workshop in 2012/13. Both have spent all of their time in service in company with Southern Shorthaul Railroad locomotives to date.

Also under overhaul at North Bendigo is B75 and five UGL Rail C44aci units and unspecified number of NRE E-3000E3B locomotives on order.

On 28 June 2014, B75 returned to operational service after being given an overhaul by Southern Shorthaul Railroad. Along with 4911 and the two BRM locomotives, it is currently one of the four locomotives that serve Consolidated Rail Leasing.

Fleet

References

Railway rolling stock leasing companies of Australia
Australian companies established in 2012
Transport companies established in 2012